Coleman Hawkins and His Orchestra is an album by saxophonist Coleman Hawkins which was recorded in 1960 and released on the Crown label.

Track listing
All compositions by Coleman Hawkins
 "Bean in Orbit" – 6:08
 "After Midnight" – 4:51
 "Hassle" – 6:41
 "Moodsville" – 6:21
 "Stalking" – 9:20

Personnel
Coleman Hawkins – tenor saxophone
Thad Jones – trumpet
Eddie Costa – piano, vibraphone
George Duvivier – bass
Osie Johnson – drums

References

Coleman Hawkins albums
1960 albums
Crown Records albums